Buettner is a surname. Notable people with the surname include:

Carol A. Buettner (born 1948), American politician
Jan Henric Buettner (born 1964), German entrepreneur
Kenneth L. Buettner (born 1950), American judge
Michael Buettner (born 1973), Australian rugby league official and former player 
Robert Buettner, American novelist